Carinispa is a genus of the tribe Chalepini with one known species.

Species 
 Carinispa nevermanni (Uhmann, 1930)

References 

Cassidinae
Monotypic Chrysomelidae genera